Kusasalethu (formerly Elandskraal, an amalgamation of Elandsrand and Deelkraal mines) is a gold mine on the West Wits Line near Carletonville, Gauteng, South Africa, and  west of Johannesburg.

Overview
The mine is owned by the Harmony Gold Mining Co. Ltd. and is the amalgamation of the Deelkraal mine and Elandsrand mines, bought from AngloGold in 2001 for R1 billion in cash.

Kusasalethu mines mainly the Ventersdorp Contact Reef (VCR) and the Carbon Leader. Production in 2007 was 195,000 ounces, proven and probable reserves totalled 8.3 million ounces and additional identified resources totalled 7.1 million ounces. It is expected to be complete in 2010 and boost annual production to 416,000 ounces.

On 3 October 2007 3,200 employees were trapped underground when a  compressed air pipe broke away just below surface in the men and material shaft and fell to the shaft bottom, severely damaging both the shaft steelwork and the electricity supply to the sub men and material shaft. The trapped workers were all brought to surface by 4.00 p.m. the following day after cages had been installed in the rock shaft. 48 days of production were lost.

In late 2014, the mine was shut down for two weeks as part of efforts to clear illegal miners from working.

Production
Recent production figures:

See also
 Elandsrand township

References

External links 
 Schalk Burger, 10 December 2010, Kusasalethu aims to produce 200 000 oz of gold in 2011.

Gold mines in South Africa
Underground mines in South Africa
Buildings and structures in Gauteng
Economy of Gauteng